Sonia Orbeliani (1875-1915) was a Russian Empire princess and courtier. She was a lady-in-waiting of the Russian empress Alexandra Feodorovna (Alix of Hesse) from 1898 until 1915.

Biography
Born into the House of Orbeliani Sophia was the middle child and the only daughter of Russian imperial general, governor of Kutaisi, Prince Ivan Makarovich Orbeliani and his wife, Princess Maria Svyatopolk-Mirska (1855-1889). Her brothers were Prince Mamuka Ivanovich Orbliani (1873-1924) and Prince Dmitry Ivanovich Orbeliani (1873-1922), who served as personal assistant of the Grand Duke Alexander Mikhailovich of Russia.

Orbeliani was given a typical education for an aristocratic woman of the time with a focus on accomplishments, and described as a confident, amusing blonde and as an able pianist, painter, dancer and singer.  Because of her extrovert nature and charm, she was thought to be able to make the introvert and reserved empress to participate more in social life, and she arranged small gatherings of noblewomen where she and the empress played the piano, in an unsuccessful attempt to make Alexandra more sociable.  She was a personal friend of Alexandra Feodorovna and was able to criticize her without offending the empress. The secret police described her as passionate, vulgar and with a intense loyalty to Alexandra. 

In 1903, she was affected by a spinal illness, and given a diagnosis in which she was to become gradually paralyzed and finally die. Uncommonly, she continued as lady-in-waiting; first as before, eventually only tending to secretarial tasks and finally confined to bed, nursed by the empress. She died in the Imperial palace in 1915.

References 

1875 births
1915 deaths
Ladies-in-waiting from the Russian Empire
Court of Nicholas II of Russia